Plumpton may refer to:

Places

Places in Australia
 Plumpton, New South Wales, suburb of Sydney
 Plumpton, Victoria, suburb of Melbourne

Places in England
 Plumpton, Cumbria, village
 Plumpton, Lancashire (Great Plumpton and Little Plumpton)
 Plumpton, Northamptonshire
 Plumpton, East Sussex, village and civil parish
Plumpton College, a college of further education
Plumpton Place, an Elizabethan manor house
Plumpton Racecourse, a National Hunt racecourse
Plumpton railway station
Plumpton, a historic spelling of Plompton, North Yorkshire
Plumpton Rocks, a rock formation

Sport 
 Plumpton Racecourse, a National Hunt horse-racing course, at Plumpton, East Sussex
 plumpton (greyhound racing), Australian term for an enclosed greyhound track

People with surname Plumpton
Ben Plumpton (born 1998), Maltese water polo player
Diana Plumpton (1911–1973), English golfer
Sir William Plumpton (1404–1480), English aristocrat, landowner and administrator

Other 
HMS Plumpton, a British Racecourse class minesweeper of the early 20th century